Jhabua Assembly constituency is one of the 230 Vidhan Sabha (Legislative Assembly) constituencies of Madhya Pradesh state in central India. Jhabua Assembly constituency is one of the three Assembly constituencies in Jhabua district. It is a segment of Ratlam (Lok Sabha constituency) .

Members of Vidhan Sabha
 1972 : Gangabai (Congress)
 1977 : Bapu Singh Damar (INC)
 2013 : Shantilal Bilwal (BJP)

Election results

2019 Bypoll

See also
 Jhabua

References

Assembly constituencies of Madhya Pradesh
Jhabua district